Neocytherideididae is a family of ostracods belonging to the order Podocopida.

Genera:
 Copytus Skogsberg, 1939
 Hemicytherideis Ruggieri, 1952
 Microhoweina Mohammed & Keyser, 2012
 Neocopytus Kulkoyluoglu, Colin & Kiliç, 2007
 Neocytherideis Puri, 1952
 Papillosacythere Whatley, Chadwick, Coxill & Toy, 1987
 Procytherideis Ruggieri, 1978
 Sahnia Puri, 1952
 Sahnicythere Athersuch, 1982

References

Ostracods